Brandon Nakashima was the defending champion but chose not to defend his title.

Grégoire Barrère won the title after defeating Luca Van Assche 6–3, 6–3 in the final.

Seeds

Draw

Finals

Top half

Bottom half

References

External links
Main draw
Qualifying draw

Brest Challenger - 1
2022 Singles